Aba is a city in the northeast of the Haut-Uélé province in the Democratic Republic of the Congo; it is near the border with South Sudan.

Transport
It is served by Aba Airport.

References

Populated places in Haut-Uélé
Democratic Republic of the Congo–South Sudan border crossings